Creaserinus is a genus of Digger Crayfish in the family Cambaridae. There are about 15 described species in Creaserinus, found in North America.

This genus was formerly considered a subgenus of Fallicambarus.

Species
These 15 species belong to the genus Creaserinus:

 Creaserinus brevistylus (DP Johnson, Stern & Crandall, 2021)
 Creaserinus burrisi (Fitzpatrick, 1987) (burrowing bog crayfish)
 Creaserinus byersi (Hobbs, 1941)
 Creaserinus caesius (Hobbs, 1975)
 Creaserinus clausus (DP Johnson, Stern & Crandall, 2021)
 Creaserinus crenastylus (DP Johnson, Stern & Crandall, 2021)
 Creaserinus danielae (Hobbs, 1975) (speckled burrowing crayfish)
 Creaserinus fodiens (Cottle, 1863) (digger crayfish)
 Creaserinus gilpini (Hobbs & Robison, 1989) (Jefferson County crayfish)
 Creaserinus gordoni (Fitzpatrick, 1987) (Camp Shelby burrowing crayfish)
 Creaserinus hedgpethi (Hobbs, 1948)
 Creaserinus hortoni (Hobbs & Fitzpatrick, 1970) (Hatchie burrowing crayfish)
 Creaserinus limulus (DP Johnson, Stern & Crandall, 2021)
 Creaserinus oryktes (Penn & Marlow, 1959)
 Creaserinus trinensis (DP Johnson, Stern & Crandall, 2021)

References

Further reading
 

Cambaridae
Taxa named by Horton H. Hobbs Jr.
Decapod genera
Crustacean genera